Joel Ross (born Joel Hogg 31 May 1977) is a multi award winning British radio DJ and television presenter. He has worked with a co-host Jason King (known on-air as JK). He currently presents the Rock FM Breakfast Show.

Career

Best known for  

Ross is best known for his work on BBC radio 1 and hosting BBC TV shows Hider in the House and Escape from Scorpion Island

Ross started out in radio as a presenter on his hometown station Yorkshire Coast Radio in 1993, at the age of 16, presenting the evening show and Nothing But the 90's. He left in late 1995 and went on to present various shows on Minster FM, A1FM, Sun City 103.4, TFM Radio and Metro Radio, as well as being a travel presenter for stations in the North.

JK and Joel 

He joined Viking FM in 1996, starting on the nightshift. He worked his way up to the late show, off-air breakfast producer, evening show host and afternoon show presenter. He was then offered the chance to pair up with JK  on the breakfast show, which JK had hosted alone for the previous year.

Other work
In 2011, Ross became the host of Wrestle Talk TV. Originally a YouTube-based show talking about the recent wrestling action as well as interviews with both WWE and TNA wrestlers. The show debuted on Challenge on 26 August 2012. Ross was fired in March 2014 for making comments on social media which WTTV deemed "unacceptable".

In January 2013, Ross joined Heart West Midlands, presenting local weekend shows. He has also covered for Neil 'Roberto' Williams on the networked evening show and the weekday breakfast show in the West Midlands. He joined Heart North West on 6 May 2014 as the station's breakfast show co-host, alongside Lorna Bancroft.

In 2019, Heart nationalised their Breakfast show which brought an end to Joel and Lorna on Heart North West. Ross became the host of Rock FM's Breakfast Show .

References

External links
 

1977 births
Living people
Reality show winners
British radio DJs
People from Scarborough, North Yorkshire
Capital (radio network)
Heart (radio network)
Top of the Pops presenters